Liset Alea is a Cuban-born singer, songwriter and multi-instrumentalist who lives in Paris, best known as a solo artist and lead singer in Nouvelle Vague.

Career

Early collaborations and solo work
In 1998, Alea co-founded drum & bass/trip hop band Etro Anime. She co-wrote all the songs and provided lead vocals on their 2003 album See the Sound. Soon after, she left the band to pursue a solo career. Her debut LP, No Sleep, was released in multiple European territories on EMI in 2005. Around that time, she also began writing songs for other artists, including "Catfight," a single from Belgium’s Star Academy winner Katerine’s 2005 debut. She later co-wrote "Il Futuro Che Sara" for Chiara Galiazzo, which was in competition at the 2013 Sanremo Music Festival in Italy.

In 2010, Alea independently wrote and co-produced a Spanish-language album, Sin Cera. It has not been released.

Nouvelle Vague
In 2008, Alea met Marc Collin, the founder of Nouvelle Vague. She opened for the group in Miami, and officially joined them as a lead singer in 2009. She sings a cover of the Cocteau Twins song "Athol Brose" on Nouvelle Vague's 2016 album I Could Be Happy. After 8 years of touring with the band, she left the group in 2017.

Music in television
While residing in Paris, Alea began collaborating with French DJ Alexkid, appearing on his 2003 album Mint. In 2009, Alea, Alexkid and French producer/DJ Rodriguez Jr formed the Honeythieves. The trio's song "Reminder" was in 2009 episodes of Entourage and 90210, and was remixed by RAC’s Andre Anjos.

Performances and collaborations
“Ceremony," a multimedia "costume show turned concert" created and directed by French fashion designer Jean-Charles de Castelbajac, was based on Nouvelle Vague's repertoire. Alea participated in all live performances of the musical, including presentations of the show at the 2011 digital arts festival Exit at the MAC Creteil art center in Los Angeles, and at the 2012 White Nights Festival in Tel Aviv.

Alea has been singled out for her unique style and presence, and for "providing a strong, sultry voice and some amazing vocal pyrotechnics." She has toured the world with Nouvelle Vague, including North America, Europe, Russia and South Africa. She has done a European tour with Alexkid in support of the release of Mint, a tour supporting Sananda Maitreya (formerly known as Terence Trent D'Arby), and performed with Raul Paz. She shared the stage with Juanes at the 2009 Paz Sin Fronteras II concert in Cuba, performing to an audience of 1.2 million people.

Personal life
Alea was born in Havana, Cuba. She was raised in Miami, Florida, and has lived in New York City, Costa Rica, Paris, London and Amsterdam. She is in a relationship with musician Rodriguez Jr.

Discography

Solo
 No Sleep (2005, EMI)
 Sin Cera (2010, unreleased)
 Hunter and Tiger EP (2016)
 Heart-Headed (2016)

Appears on
 Etro Anime – See the Sound (2003)
 Alexkid – Mint (2003)
 Alexkid – Caracol (2006)
 Dubphonic – Relight (2009)
 Olga Kouklaki – I U Need (2012)

TV/film soundtrack appearances
 Las Vegas – "Come With Me" (with Alexkid) (2003, Season 1, Episode 9)
 Six Feet Under – "Don’t Hide It" (with Alexkid) (2005, Season 5, Episode 59)
 Entourage – "Reminder" (with Honeythieves) (2009, Season 6, Episode 11)
 90210 – "Reminder (RAC Remix)" (with Honeythieves ) (2009, Season 2, Episode 3)
 Holy Rollers – "If You Forget Me" (with Remix Artist Collective) (2010)

Songwriting

References

1979 births
Living people
Trip hop musicians
American women in electronic music
American new wave musicians
American drum and bass musicians
21st-century American women singers
21st-century American singers
Cuban emigrants to the United States
American expatriates in Costa Rica
American expatriates in France
American expatriates in England
American expatriates in the Netherlands
Musicians from Havana
Musicians from Miami